Spoo may refer to:

 Bob Spoo (1937–2018), an American college football coach
 Caspar Mathias Spoo (1837–1914), a Luxembourgish industrialist and politician
 Spoo, a fictional food in the Babylon 5 science fiction television series